Green market products are previously owned products that have been previously used and put back into productive use. These products are often repaired, refurbished and recycled by brokers, resellers or the original manufacturer. They are suitable for resale to customers as a lower cost alternative to buying new goods from standard distribution channels.

History of term
The term "green market" refers to the fact that the resold goods are put back into productive use, which is the most environmentally friendly use of used or discontinued products.

Although the resale of green market goods sometimes competes with the original manufacturer, it also helps the manufacturer and the original end user by allowing the original end user to receive value for the product they no longer need and to use that value in purchasing new goods from the manufacturer.

Parts from green market goods are sometimes necessary for the maintenance of current products that are in need of replacement parts which are no longer available.

Black, grey and green market laws 
Manufacturers that produce products including computer, telecom equipment, technology equipment very often sell those products that equipment through distributors. Most distribution agreements require the distributor to resell the products strictly to end users. However, some distributors choose to resell those products to other resellers. In the late 1980s manufacturers labeled the resold products as "grey market".

There is nothing illegal about buying "grey market" products. In fact, the US Supreme Court has upheld that grey market products are legal for resale in the United States regardless of where they were produced or originally sold. The EU Supreme Court has similarly ruled that grey market products are legal for resale in the EU, provided that the equipment was originally sold by the manufacturer inside the EU.

Manufacturers created the term "grey market" in an effort to instill fear in customers that buying such equipment was somehow illegal in an effort to assure manufacturers that customers would only purchase buy directly from them.

The term "grey market" was chosen because of it similarity to the old term "Black Market" which refers to stolen and illegal products.

Ecology
Putting green market products into productive use or using the parts from green market products for repair is very cost effective and environmentally responsible. Replacing broken products with newer products has a negative effect on the environment and has been recognized as ecologically hazardous.

Raw materials
Electronic equipment is made up of many precious materials including highly refined glass, gold, aluminum, silver, polymers, copper and brass. Electronic recycling companies have the ability to store, disassemble, separate and transport these materials to companies for reuse in manufacturing.  This is an environmentally better solution than dumping the used products in landfills. Such dumping may pollute soil and water with dangerous and non-biodegradable waste.

References 
References-  The Association of Service and Computer Dealers International

The North American Association of Telecommunications Dealers

http://www.ascdi.com

Recycling
Informal economy
Market (economics)